Muse Residences is an apartment building condo development in Sunny Isles Beach, Florida. The 47-story condo building with 68 units was developed by Property Markets Group and S2 Development. Each unit includes a sculpture by Heidon Xhixha. The tall and narrow building was designed by Carlos Ott. Completed in 2018, making it the tallest building in Sunny Isles Beach and the tallest of Florida outside Miami.

See also
List of tallest buildings in Sunny Isles Beach

References

Buildings and structures in Miami-Dade County, Florida
Carlos Ott buildings
Apartment buildings in Florida
Skyscrapers in Florida
Residential skyscrapers in Florida
2018 establishments in Florida